The World Beaters Sing The World Beaters  is an album by the 1970 England World Cup squad created as a spin-off to the success of the song "Back Home". The album featuring songs such as a recording of "Sugar Sugar" by Bobby Moore and Francis Lee. The album was issued by Pye with a football shaped sleeve, and reached the UK top 5. The album was arranged by Phil Coulter and produced by Coulter and Bill Martin. Aside from the single "Back Home" and B-side "Cinnamon Stick", the album featured a third original Martin-Coulter composition "Glory-O", which was re-recorded two years later by a marching band directed by Martin and Coulter as the B-side of the songwriter's Philips single of the Munich 1972 Summer Olympics fanfare composed by Herbert Rehbein.

Track listing

Reissues
Moore's contributions were reissued on Forever Blowing Bubbles a 1997 compilation album by West Ham United FC and supporters. The track listing includes:

 West Ham United — Boleyn Boys with the 1975 FA Cup Final West Ham United squad
 Oh Sweet England — Moore, Hurst & Peters with the 1975 FA Cup Final West Ham United squad
 Sugar Sugar - Bobby Moore & Friends
 I'm Forever Blowing Bubbles - Cockney Rejects
 West Side Boys — Cockney Rejects
 Viva Bobby Moore - The Business
 Bobby Moore Was Innocent - Serious Drinking
 Leroys Boots - Barmy Army
 Devo - Barmy Army
 Blunted Irons — United Nations
 Billy Bonds MBE — Barmy Army
 Come on You Irons - Rainbow's Quest
 Bobby Moore's legs — Barmy Army
 Up the Hammers — Alf's Army
 Over Land & Sea - Chicken Iron
 Terminator - Flat Back Four

References

1970 albums
1997 compilation albums
Pye Records albums
Football songs and chants
England at the 1970 FIFA World Cup
Albums produced by Phil Coulter
Albums produced by Bill Martin (musician)